Choshen Mishpat is the Hebrew for "Breastplate of Judgement". The term is associated with one of the four sections of Rabbi Jacob ben Asher's compilation of halakha (Jewish law), Arba'ah Turim. This section treats aspects of Jewish law pertinent to finance, torts, legal procedure and loans and interest in Judaism. Later, Rabbi Yosef Karo modeled the framework of his own compilation of practical Jewish law, the Shulkhan Arukh, after the Arba'ah Turim. Many later commentators used this framework as well. Thus, Choshen Mishpat in common usage may refer to an area of halakha, non-specific to Rabbi Jacob ben Asher's compilation.

See also
The other three sections of Arba'ah Turim and other works borrowing its organizational scheme are: 
Orach Chayim
Yoreh De'ah
Even HaEzer

Further reading
 Quint, Emanuel, 1990–2007, "A Restatement of Rabbinic Civil Law - 11 Vol. Set", Gefen Publishing House. 

Rabbinic legal texts and responsa
Hebrew-language religious books
Hebrew words and phrases in Jewish law